The 1996–97 Welsh Alliance League was the thirteenth season of the Welsh Alliance League of football after its establishment in 1984. The league was won by Glantraeth.

League table

References

External links
Welsh Alliance League

Welsh Alliance League seasons
3